Corral Falso is a corregimiento in San Francisco District, Veraguas Province, Panama with a population of 469 as of 2010. Its population as of 1990 was 416; its population as of 2000 was 401.

References

Corregimientos of Veraguas Province